Holger Mühlbauer (born 1964) is a German jurist and writer, focused on technical standards and information security, working for the German DIN as managing director of a committee, for the Austrian Standards, the European Committee for Standardization (CEN) and the International Standards Organisation (ISO). He is managing director of TeleTrusT, and author of specialist books.

Career 
Mühlbauer first trained to be a metalworker and worked in the profession.

Berlin
After military service Mühlbauer studied law, and worked as a scientific assistant at the TU Berlin for the faculty of computer science (Informatik), where he focused on data security and information law (Informationsrecht). He wrote his doctoral thesis in 1994 about Einwohnermeldewesen (Residents' registration). From 1996 he worked for the Deutsches Institut für Normung (DIN), the German institute for technical standards in Berlin, as managing director for the standards committee (Normenausschuss) for usability and services.

Vienna
In 2000, Mühlbauer moved to the Austrian equivalent, Austrian Standards, in Vienna. He held the position of committee Secretary in organisations such as the European Committee for Standardization (CEN) and the International Standards Organisation (ISO). For ISO, he served as Secretary of service-related committees, including Personal Financial Planning, Psychological Assessment, Brand Valuation, Learning Services for Non-Formal Education and Training, and Rating Services. He initiated the ISO project "Brand valuation". He serves as an auditor for the ISO 20252 standard,  (Requirements on services of market, opinion and social research), and for ISO 10668, (Brand valuation), among others.

Return to Berlin
Since 2009, Mühlbauer is the managing director of the IT security association TeleTrusT, which has established reliable conditions for trustworthy application of information and communication technologies. In 2020, he contributed to Wirtschaftswoches Economy 4.0 – Die Digitalisierung der Wirtschaft (the digitalisation of science).

Publications 
Mühlbauer authored specialist books, including practical dictionaries (Praxiswörterbuch).

 2020 Praxiswörterbuch / Brand valuation (English)
 2019 Konferenz-Englisch / Stichwörter und Wendungen für englischsprachige Sitzungen (German/English)
 2019 Praxiswörterbuch / ISO-Terminologie für Markt-, Meinungs- und Sozialforschung (English/German)
 2018 Made in Germany - als Marke und Kennzeichnung / Möglichkeiten und Einschränkungen
 2015 Kurze Einführung in die Normung / Das Wesentliche zu DIN, CEN und ISO

References

External links 
 

1964 births
Living people
Jurists from Berlin
Chief executives of computer security organizations